Maxi Biewer (born 24 May 1964) is a German television presenter and actress.

Biewer was born in Berlin, the daughter of actor Gerd Biewer and Brigitte Krause. She speaks German, English, Russian, and French. Biewer attended a Polytechnic High School in Berlin, Köpenick, where it also passed the Abitur. She graduated from the Academy of Dramatic Arts "Ernst Busch" in Berlin.

Between 1987 and 1989 she served in an ensemble of actors on East German television in guest roles and worked at the Theater Dessau. In 1989 Biewer moved to West Berlin, and since 1992 she has been the weather presenter at RTL Television. She achieved some notoriety for a televised fit of laughter she suffered while presenting a weather forecast on the RTL Morning Program Punkt 6 and for one of her presentations on the same program which was set to music by Stefan Raab. In 2010 Biewer played herself as an RTL weather expert in the award-winning series Doctor's Diary, which aired in January 2011.

In 1996 she was romantically linked with the RTL morning show presenter Wolfram Kons. A year later she married the French-Canadian Jean-Patrice Venn, whom she met on one of her many trips to Montreal. Biewer currently lives with her husband in Hennef. She spends much of her spare time on a sailboat on the Baltic Sea.

Filmography (selection)

 1981: Der Kuckuck bin ich
 1983: Rügensagen
 1984: Kaskade rückwärts
 1984: Polizeiruf 110: Schwere Jahre (1. Teil) (TV series)
 1985: Ferienheim Bergkristall: Ein Fall für Alois (TV Series)
 1985: Ernst Thälmann
 1987: Maxe Baumann aus Berlin (television Film)
 1987: Sachsens Glanz und Preußens Gloria (TV miniseries)
 1987: Der Geisterseher
 1987: Glück hat seine Zeit
 1987: Sidonies Bilder
 1987: Vater gesucht
 1988: Der Staatsanwalt hat das Wort: Ohne Wenn und Aber (TV series)
 1989: Der lange Weg zu Angerer
 1989: Polizeiruf 110: Der Wahrheit verpflichtet (TV series)
 1989: Auf den zweiten Blick
 1990: Himmelsschlüssel
 1990: Unser Lehrer Doktor Specht (TV series)
 1996:

References

External links
Official site

1964 births
Living people
Actresses from Berlin
German television presenters
Weather presenters
German women television presenters
RTL Group people